Souli Paramythia Football Club is a Greek football club, based in Paramythia, Thesprotia, Greece.

Honours

Domestic

Thesprotia FCA champion: 4
 1992–93, 2006–07, 2008–09, 2017–18
 Thesprotia FCA Cup Winners: 5
 2011–12, 2013–14, 2014–15, 2015–16, 2018–19
 Thesprotia FCA Super Cup Winners: 3
 2012, 2015, 2016

References

Football clubs in Epirus
Thesprotia
Association football clubs established in 1934
1934 establishments in Greece
Gamma Ethniki clubs